Bromelia pinguin is a plant species in the genus Bromelia. This species is native to Central America, Mexico, the West Indies and northern South America. It is also reportedly naturalized in Florida. It is very common in Jamaica, where it is planted as a fence around pasture lands, on account of its prickly leaves. The plant can be stripped of its pulp, soaked in water, and beaten with a wooden mallet, and it yields a fiber whence thread is made. In Nicaragua and El Salvador it is used to make gruel.

References

Additional sources

External links

pinguin
Flora of Central America
Flora of Mexico
Flora of South America
Flora of the Caribbean
Plants described in 1753
Taxa named by Carl Linnaeus
Edible plants
Flora without expected TNC conservation status

ro:Gravatá